The Holy Grail is a treasure that serves as an important  motif in Arthurian literature. Various traditions describe the Holy Grail as a cup, dish, or stone with miraculous healing powers, sometimes providing eternal youth or sustenance in infinite abundance, often guarded in the custody of the Fisher King and located in the hidden Grail castle. By analogy, any elusive object or goal of great significance may be perceived as a "holy grail" by those seeking such.

A "grail" (Old French: graal or greal), wondrous but not unequivocally holy, first appears in Perceval, the Story of the Grail, an unfinished chivalric romance written by Chrétien de Troyes around 1190. Chrétien's story inspired many continuations, translators and interpreters in the later-12th and early-13th centuries, including Wolfram von Eschenbach, who perceived the Grail as a stone. The Christian, Celtic or possibly other origins of the Arthurian grail  trope are uncertain and have been debated amongst literary scholars and historians.

In the late-12th century, Robert de Boron in Joseph d'Arimathie portrayed the Grail as Jesus's  vessel from the Last Supper, which Joseph of Arimathea used to catch  Christ's blood at the crucifixion. Thereafter, the Holy Grail became interwoven with the legend of the Holy Chalice, the Last Supper cup, an idea continued in works such as the Lancelot-Grail cycle and consequently the 15th-century Le Morte d'Arthur. In this form, it is now a popular theme in modern culture and has become the subject of  pseudohistorical writings and of conspiracy theories.

Etymology

This etymology was used by some later medieval British writers such as Thomas Malory, and became prominent in the conspiracy theory developed in the book The Holy Blood and the Holy Grail, in which  refers to the Jesus bloodline.

Medieval literature

The literature surrounding the Grail can be divided into two groups. The first concerns King Arthur's knights visiting the Grail castle or questing after the object. The second concerns the Grail's history in the time of Joseph of Arimathea.

The nine works from the first group are:
 Perceval, the Story of the Grail by Chrétien de Troyes.
The Four Continuations of Chrétien's unfinished poem, by authors of differing vision and talent, designed to bring the story to a close.
 Parzival by Wolfram von Eschenbach, which adapted at least the holiness of Robert's Grail into the framework of Chrétien's story. In Wolfram's telling, the Grail was kept safe at the castle of Munsalvaesche (mons salvationis), entrusted to Titurel, the first Grail King. Some, not least the Benedictine monks, have identified the castle with their real sanctuary of Montserrat in Catalonia.
 The Didot Perceval, named after the manuscript's former owner, and purportedly a prosification of Robert de Boron's sequel to Joseph d'Arimathie and Merlin.
 Welsh romance Peredur son of Efrawg, a loose translation of Chrétien's poem and the Continuations, with some influence from native Welsh literature. 
 Perlesvaus, called the "least canonical" Grail romance because of its very different character.
 German poem Diu Crône (The Crown), in which Gawain, rather than Perceval, achieves the Grail.
 The Lancelot section of the vast Vulgate Cycle introduced the new Grail hero, Galahad. The Queste del Saint Graal, a follow-up part of the cycle, concerns Galahad's eventual achievement of the Grail.

Of the second group there are:
Robert de Boron's Joseph d'Arimathie.
 The Estoire del Saint Graal, the first part of the Vulgate Cycle (but written after Lancelot and the Queste), based on Robert's tale but expanding it greatly with many new details.
 Verses by Rigaut de Barbezieux, a late 12th or early 13th-century Provençal troubador, where mention is made of Perceval, the lance, and the Grail ("Like Perceval when he lived, who stood amazed in contemplation, so that he was quite unable to ask what purpose the lance and grail served" – "Attressi con Persavaus el temps que vivia, que s'esbait d'esgarder tant qu'anc non saup demandar de que servia la lansa ni-l grazaus").

The Grail was considered a bowl or dish when first described by Chrétien de Troyes. There, it is a processional salver, a tray, used to serve at a feast. Hélinand of Froidmont described a grail as a "wide and deep saucer" (scutella lata et aliquantulum profunda); other authors had their own ideas. Robert de Boron portrayed it as the vessel of the Last Supper. Peredur son of Efrawg had no Grail as such, presenting the hero instead with a platter containing his kinsman's bloody, severed head.

Chrétien de Troyes
The Grail is first featured in Perceval, le Conte du Graal (The Story of the Grail) by Chrétien de Troyes, who claims he was working from a source book given to him by his patron, Count Philip of Flanders. In this incomplete poem, dated sometime between 1180 and 1191, the object has not yet acquired the implications of holiness it would have in later works. While dining in the magical abode of the Fisher King, Perceval witnesses a wondrous procession in which youths carry magnificent objects from one chamber to another, passing before him at each course of the meal. First comes a young man carrying a bleeding lance, then two boys carrying candelabras. Finally, a beautiful young girl emerges bearing an elaborately decorated graal, or "grail".

Chrétien refers to this object not as "The Grail" but as "a grail" (un graal), showing the word was used, in its earliest literary context, as a common noun. For Chrétien, a grail was a wide, somewhat deep, dish or bowl, interesting because it contained not a pike, salmon, or lamprey, as the audience may have expected for such a container, but a single Communion wafer which provided sustenance for the Fisher King's crippled father. Perceval, who had been warned against talking too much, remains silent through all of this and wakes up the next morning alone. He later learns that if he had asked the appropriate questions about what he saw, he would have healed his maimed host, much to his honour. The story of the Wounded King's mystical fasting is not unique; several saints were said to have lived without food besides communion, for instance Saint Catherine of Genoa. This may imply that Chrétien intended the Communion wafer to be the significant part of the ritual, and the Grail to be a mere prop.

Robert de Boron
Though Chrétien's account is the earliest and most influential of all Grail texts, it was in the work of Robert de Boron that the Grail truly became the "Holy Grail" and assumed the form most familiar to modern readers in its Christian context. In his verse romance Joseph d'Arimathie, composed between 1191 and 1202, Robert tells the story of Joseph of Arimathea acquiring the chalice of the Last Supper to collect Christ's blood upon his removal from the cross. Joseph is thrown in prison, where Christ visits him and explains the mysteries of the blessed cup. Upon his release, Joseph gathers his in-laws and other followers and travels to the west. He founds a dynasty of Grail keepers that eventually includes Perceval.

Wolfram von Eschenbach
In Parzival, Wolfram von Eschenbach, citing the authority of a certain (probably fictional) Kyot the Provençal, claimed the Grail was a Stone, the sanctuary of the neutral angels who took neither side during Lucifer's rebellion. It is called Lapis exillis, which in alchemy is the name of the Philosopher's stone.

Lancelot-Grail 

The authors of the Vulgate Cycle used the Grail as a symbol of divine grace; the virgin Galahad, illegitimate son of Lancelot and Elaine, the world's greatest knight and the Grail Bearer at the castle of Corbenic, is destined to achieve the Grail, his spiritual purity making him a greater warrior than even his illustrious father. The Queste del Saint Graal (The Quest of The Holy Grail) tells also of the adventures of various Knights of the Round Table in their eponymous quest. Some of them, including Percival and Bors the Younger, eventually join Galahad as his companions near the successful end of the Grail Quest and are witnesses of his ascension to Heaven.

Galahad and the interpretation of the Grail involving him were picked up in the 15th century by Thomas Malory in Le Morte d'Arthur and remain popular today. While it is not explicit that the Holy Grail is never to be seen again on Earth, it is stated by Malory that there has since then been no knight capable of obtaining it.

Scholarly hypotheses
Scholars have long speculated on the origins of the Holy Grail before Chrétien, suggesting that it may contain elements of the trope of magical cauldrons from Celtic mythology and later Welsh mythology combined with Christian legend surrounding the Eucharist, the latter found in Eastern Christian sources, conceivably in that of the Byzantine Mass, or even Persian sources. The view that the "origin" of the Grail legend should be seen as deriving from Celtic mythology was championed by Roger Sherman Loomis, Alfred Nutt and Jessie Weston. Loomis traced a number of parallels between medieval Welsh literature and Irish material and the Grail romances, including similarities between the Mabinogions Bran the Blessed and the Arthurian Fisher King, and between Bran's life-restoring cauldron and the Grail.

The opposing view dismissed the "Celtic" connections as spurious and interpreted the legend as essentially Christian in origin. Joseph Goering has identified sources for Grail imagery in 12th-century wall paintings from churches in the Catalan Pyrenees (now mostly removed to the Museu Nacional d'Art de Catalunya), which present unique iconic images of the Virgin Mary holding a bowl that radiates tongues of fire, images that predate the first literary account by Chrétien de Troyes. Goering argues that they were the original inspiration for the Grail legend.

Psychologists Emma Jung and Marie-Louise von Franz used analytical psychology to interpret the Grail as a series of symbols in their book The Grail Legend. This expanded on interpretations by Carl Jung, which were later invoked by Joseph Campbell.

Richard Barber (2004) argued that the Grail legend is connected to the introduction of "more ceremony and mysticism" surrounding the sacrament of the Eucharist in the high medieval period, proposing that the first Grail stories may have been connected to the "renewal in this traditional sacrament". Daniel Scavone (1999, 2003) has argued that the "Grail" in origin referred to the Image of Edessa. Goulven Peron (2016) suggested that the Holy Grail may reflect the horn of the river-god Achelous as described by Ovid in the Metamorphoses.

Later traditions

Relics

In the wake of the Arthurian romances, several artifacts came to be identified as the Holy Grail in medieval relic veneration. These artifacts are said to have been the vessel used at the Last Supper, but other details vary. Despite the prominence of the Grail literature, traditions about a Last Supper relic remained rare in contrast to other items associated with Jesus' last days, such as the True Cross and Holy Lance.

One tradition predates the Grail romances: in the 7th century, the pilgrim Arculf reported that the Last Supper chalice was displayed near Jerusalem. In the wake of Robert de Boron's Grail works, several other items came to be claimed as the true Last Supper vessel. In the late 12th century, one was said to be in Byzantium; Albrecht von Scharfenberg's Grail romance Der Jüngere Titurel associated it explicitly with the Arthurian Grail, but claimed it was only a copy. This item was said to have been looted in the Fourth Crusade and brought to Troyes in France, but it was lost during the French Revolution.

Two relics associated with the Grail survive today. The Sacro Catino (Sacred Basin, also known as the Genoa Chalice) is a green glass dish held at the Genoa Cathedral said to have been used at the Last Supper. Its provenance is unknown, and there are two divergent accounts of how it was brought to Genoa by Crusaders in the 12th century. It was not associated with the Last Supper until later, in the wake of the Grail romances; the first known association is in Jacobus de Voragine's chronicle of Genoa in the late 13th century, which draws on the Grail literary tradition. The Catino was moved and broken during Napoleon's conquest in the early 19th century, revealing that it is glass rather than emerald.

The Holy Chalice of Valencia is an agate dish with a mounting for use as a chalice. The bowl may date to Greco-Roman times, but its dating is unclear, and its provenance is unknown before 1399, when it was gifted to Martin I of Aragon. By the 14th century an elaborate tradition had developed that this object was the Last Supper chalice. This tradition mirrors aspects of the Grail material, with several major differences, suggesting a separate tradition entirely. It is not associated with Joseph of Arimathea or Jesus' blood; it is said to have been taken to Rome by Saint Peter and later entrusted to Saint Lawrence. Early references do not call the object the "Grail"; the first evidence connecting it to the Grail tradition is from the 15th century. The monarchy sold the cup in the 15th century to Valencia Cathedral, where it remains a significant local icon.

Several objects were identified with the Holy Grail in the 17th century. In the 20th century, a series of new items became associated with it. These include the Nanteos Cup, a medieval wooden bowl found near Rhydyfelin, Wales; a glass dish found near Glastonbury, England; the Antioch chalice, a 6th-century silver-gilt object that became attached to the Grail legend in the 1930s, and the Chalice of Doña Urraca, a cup  made between 200 BC and 100 AD, kept in León’s basilica of Saint Isidore.

Locations associated with the Holy Grail

In the modern era, a number of places have become associated with the Holy Grail. One of the most prominent is Glastonbury in Somerset, England. Glastonbury was associated with King Arthur and his resting place of Avalon by the 12th century. In the 13th century, a legend arose that Joseph of Arimathea was the founder of Glastonbury Abbey. Early accounts of Joseph at Glastonbury focus on his role as the evangelist of Britain rather than as the custodian of the Holy Grail, but from the 15th century, the Grail became a more prominent part of the legends surrounding Glastonbury. Interest in Glastonbury resurged in the late 19th century, inspired by renewed interest in the Arthurian legend and contemporary spiritual movements centered on ancient sacred sites. In the late 19th century, John Goodchild hid a glass bowl near Glastonbury; a group of his friends, including Wellesley Tudor Pole, retrieved the cup in 1906 and promoted it as the original Holy Grail. Glastonbury and its Holy Grail legend have since become a point of focus for various New Age and Neopagan groups.

In the early 20th century, esoteric writers identified Montségur, a stronghold of the heretical Cathar sect in the 13th century, as the Grail castle. Similarly, the 14th-century Rosslyn Chapel in Midlothian, Scotland, became attached to the Grail legend in the mid-20th century when a succession of conspiracy books identified it as a secret hiding place of the Grail.

Modern interpretations

Pseudohistory and conspiracy theories
Since the 19th century, the Holy Grail has been linked to various conspiracy theories. In 1818, Austrian pseudohistorical writer Joseph von Hammer-Purgstall connected the Grail to contemporary myths surrounding the Knights Templar that cast the order as a secret society dedicated to mystical knowledge and relics. In Hammer-Purgstall's work, the Grail is not a physical relic but a symbol of the secret knowledge that the Templars sought. There is no historical evidence linking the Templars to a search for the Grail, but subsequent writers have elaborated on the Templar theories.

Starting in the early 20th century, writers, particularly in France, further connected the Templars and Grail to the Cathars. In 1906, French esoteric writer Joséphin Péladan identified the Cathar castle of Montségur with Munsalväsche or Montsalvat, the Grail castle in Wolfram's Parzival. This identification has inspired a wider legend asserting that the Cathars possessed the Holy Grail. According to these stories, the Cathars guarded the Grail at Montségur, and smuggled it out when the castle fell in 1244.

Beginning in 1933, German writer Otto Rahn published a series of books tying the Grail, Templars, and Cathars to modern German nationalist mythology. According to Rahn, the Grail was a symbol of a pure Germanic religion repressed by Christianity. Rahn's books inspired interest in the Grail within the Nazi occultist circles and led to the SS chief Heinrich Himmler's abortive sponsorship of Rahn's search for the Grail, as well as many subsequent conspiracy theories and fictional works about the Nazis searching for the Grail.

In the late 20th century, writers Michael Baigent, Richard Leigh and Henry Lincoln created one of the most widely known conspiracy theories about the Holy Grail. The theory first appeared in the BBC documentary series Chronicle in the 1970s, and was elaborated upon in the bestselling 1982 book Holy Blood, Holy Grail. The theory combines myths about the Templars and Cathars with various other legends and a prominent hoax about a secret order called the Priory of Sion. According to this theory, the Holy Grail is not a physical object, but a symbol of the bloodline of Jesus. The blood connection is based on the etymological reading of san greal (holy grail) as sang real (royal blood), which dates to the 15th century. The narrative developed here is that Jesus was not divine, and had children with Mary Magdalene, who took the family to France where their descendants became the Merovingians dynasty. While the Catholic Church worked to destroy the dynasty, they were protected by the Priory of Sion and their associates, including the Templars, Cathars, and other secret societies. The book, its arguments, and its evidence have been widely dismissed by scholars as pseudohistorical, but it has had a vast influence on conspiracy and alternate history books. It has also inspired fiction, most notably Dan Brown's 2003 novel The Da Vinci Code and its 2006 film adaptation.

Music and painting

The combination of hushed reverence, chromatic harmonies and sexualized imagery in Richard Wagner's final music drama Parsifal, premiered in 1882, developed this theme, associating the Grail – now periodically producing blood – directly with female fertility. The high seriousness of the subject was also epitomized in Dante Gabriel Rossetti's painting in which a woman modeled by Alexa Wilding holds the Grail with one hand, while adopting a gesture of blessing with the other.

A major mural series depicting the Quest for the Holy Grail was done by the artist Edwin Austin Abbey during the first decade of the 20th century for the Boston Public Library. Other artists, including George Frederic Watts and William Dyce, also portrayed grail subjects.

Literature
The story of the Grail and of the quest to find it became increasingly popular in the 19th century, referred to in literature such as Alfred, Lord Tennyson's Arthurian cycle Idylls of the King. A sexualised interpretation of the grail, now identified with female genitalia, appeared in 1870 in Hargrave Jennings' book The Rosicrucians, Their Rites and Mysteries.

 T. S. Eliot's poem The Waste Land (1922) loosely follows the legend of the Holy Grail and the Fisher King combined with vignettes of contemporary British society. In his first note to the poem Eliot attributes the title to Jessie Weston's book on the Grail legend, From Ritual to Romance. The allusion is to the wounding of the Fisher King and the subsequent sterility of his lands. A poem of the same title, though otherwise dissimilar, written by Madison Cawein, was published in 1913 in Poetry.
 In John Cowper Powys's A Glastonbury Romance (1932) the "heroine is the Grail," and its central concern is with the various myths and legends along with history associated with Glastonbury. It is also possible to see most of the main characters as undertaking a Grail quest.
 The Grail is central in Charles Williams' novel War in Heaven (1930) and his two collections of poems about Taliessin, Taliessin Through Logres and Region of the Summer Stars (1938).
The Silver Chalice (1952) is a non-Arthurian historical Grail novel by Thomas B. Costain.
 A quest for the Grail appears in Nelson DeMille's adventure novel The Quest (1975), set during the 1970s.
 Marion Zimmer Bradley's Arthurian revisionist fantasy novel The Mists of Avalon (1983) presented the Grail as a symbol of water, part of a set of objects representing the four classical elements. 
 The main theme of Rosalind Miles' Child of the Holy Grail (2000) in her Guenevere series is the story of the Grail quest by the 14-year-old Galahad.
 The Grail motif features heavily in Umberto Eco's 2000 novel Baudolino, set in the 12th century.
 It is the subject of Bernard Cornwell's historical fiction series of books The Grail Quest (2000–2012), set during the Hundred Years War. In his series the Warlord Chronicles, an adaptation of the Arthurian legend, Cornwell also reimagines the Grail quest as a quest for a cauldron which is one of the Thirteen Treasures of Britain from Celtic mythology.
 Influenced by the 1982 publication of the ostensibly non-fiction The Holy Blood and the Holy Grail, Dan Brown's The Da Vinci Code (2003) has the "grail"  taken to refer to Mary Magdalene as the "receptacle" of Jesus' bloodline (playing on the sang real etymology). In Brown's novel, it is hinted that this Grail was long buried beneath Rosslyn Chapel in Scotland, but that in recent decades its guardians had it moved to a secret chamber embedded in the floor beneath the Inverted Pyramid in the entrance of the Louvre museum.
 Michael Moorcock's fantasy novel The War Hound and the World's Pain (1981) depicts a supernatural Grail quest set in the era of the Thirty Years' War.
German history and fantasy novel author Rainer M. Schröder wrote the trilogy Die Bruderschaft vom Heiligen Gral (The Brotherhood of the Holy Grail) about a group of four Knights Templar who save the Grail from the Fall of Acco 1291 and go through an Odyssey to bring it to the Temple in Paris in the first two books, Der Fall von Akkon (2006) and Das Amulett der Wüstenkrieger (2006), while defending the holy relic from the attempts of a satanic sect called Iscarians to steal it. In the third book, Das Labyrinth der schwarzen Abtei (2007), the four heroes must reunite to smuggle the Holy Grail out of the Temple in Paris after the fall of the Knights Templar 1307, again pursued by the Iscarians (who in the novel used the King's animosity against the Templars to their advantage). Interestingly, Schröder also indirectly addresses the Cathar Theory by letting the four heroes encounter Cathars – among them old friends from their flight from Acco – on their way to Portugal to seek refuge with the King of Portugal and travel further west.
 The 15th novel in The Dresden Files series by Jim Butcher, Skin Game (2014), features Harry Dresden being recruited by Denarian and longtime enemy Nicodemus into a heist team seeking to retrieve the Holy Grail from the vault of Hades, the lord of the Underworld. The properties of the item are not explicit, but the relic itself makes an appearance and is in the hands of Nicodemus by the end of the novel's events.
 The Holy Grail features prominently in Jack Vance's Lyonesse Trilogy, where it is the subject of an earlier quest, several generations before the birth of King Arthur. However, in contrast to the Arthurian canon, Vance's Grail is a common object lacking any magical or spiritual qualities, and the characters finding it derive little benefit.
 Grails: Quests of the Dawn (1994), edited by Richard Gilliam, Martin H. Greenberg, and Edward E. Kramer is a collection of 25 short stories about the grail by various science fiction and fantasy writers.

Film and other media

In the cinema, the Holy Grail debuted in the 1904 silent film Parsifal, an adaptation of Wagner's opera by Edwin S. Porter. More recent cinematic adaptations include Costain's The Silver Chalice made into a 1954 film by Victor Saville and Brown's The Da Vinci Code turned into a 2006 film by Ron Howard.

 The silent drama film The Light in the Dark (1922) involves discovery of the Grail in modern times.
 Robert Bresson's fantasy film Lancelot du Lac (1974) includes a more realistic version of the Grail quest from Arthurian romances.
 Monty Python and the Holy Grail (1975) is a comedic take on the Arthurian Grail quest, adapted in 2004 as the stage production Spamalot. 
 John Boorman, in his fantasy film Excalibur (1981), attempted to restore a more traditional heroic representation of an Arthurian tale, in which the Grail is revealed as a mystical means to revitalise Arthur and the barren land to which his depressive sickness is connected.
 Steven Spielberg's adventure film Indiana Jones and the Last Crusade (1989) features Indiana Jones and his father in a race for the Grail against the Nazis.
 In a pair of fifth-season episodes (September 1989), entitled "Legend of the Holy Rose," MacGyver undertakes a quest for the Grail.
 Terry Gilliam's comedy-drama film The Fisher King (1991) features the Grail quest in the modern New York City.
 In the season one episode "Grail" (1994) of the television series Babylon 5, a man named Aldous Gajic visits Babylon 5 in his continuing quest to find the Holy Grail. His quest is primarily a plot device, as the episode's action revolves not around the quest but rather around his presence and impact on the life of a station resident.
 The video game Gabriel Knight 3: Blood of the Sacred, Blood of the Damned (1999) features an alternate version of the Grail, interwoven with the mythology of the Knights Templar. The Holy Grail is revealed in the story to be the blood of Jesus Christ that contains his power, only accessible to those descended from him, with the vessel of the Grail being defined as his body itself which the Templars uncovered in the Holy Lands.
 In Pretty Guardian Sailor Moon, the Holy Grail (Sehai in the anime, or Rainbow Moon Chalice) is the magical object with which Sailor Moon transforms in her Super form.
 A science fiction version of the Grail Quest is central theme in the Stargate SG-1 season 10 episode "The Quest" (2006).
 The song "Holy Grail" by Jay-Z featuring Justin Timberlake was released in 2013.
 In the video game Persona 5 (2016), the Holy Grail is the Treasure of the game's final Palace, representing the combined desires of all of humanity for a higher power to take control of their lives and make a world that has no sense of individuality.
 In the television series Knightfall (2017), the search for the Holy Grail by the Knights Templar is a major theme of the series' first season. The Grail, which appears as a simple earthenware cup, is coveted by various factions including the Pope, who thinks that possession of it will enable him to ignite another Crusade.
 In the Fate franchise, the Holy Grail serves as the prize of the Holy Grail War, granting a single wish to the victor of the battle royale. However, it is hinted at throughout the series that this Grail is not the real chalice of Christ, but is actually an item of uncertain nature created by mages some generations ago.
 In the Assassin's Creed video game franchise the Holy Grail is mentioned. In the original game, one Templar refers to the main relic of the game as the Holy Grail, although it was later discovered to be one of many Apples of Eden. The Holy Grail was mentioned again in Templar Legends, either ending up in Scotland or Spain by different accounts. The Holy Grail appears again in Assassin's Creed: Altaïr's Chronicles, by the name of the Chalice, however this time not as an object but as a woman named Adha, similar to the sang rael, or royal blood, interpretation.
 In the fourth series of The Grand Tour, the trio goes to Nosy Boraha where they accidentally find the Holy Grail while searching for La Buse's buried treasure.
 In the 17th episode of Little Witch Academia, "Amanda O'Neill and the Holy Grail", the Holy Grail is used as a plot device in which witches Amanda O'Neill and Akko Kagari set out to find the item itself at Appleton School.
 In the 12th episode of season 9 of the American show The Office, Jim Halpert sends Dwight Schrute on a wild goose chase to find the Holy Grail. After Dwight completing all the clues to find it, but coming up empty handed, the camera cuts to Glenn drinking out of it in his office. 
 In the 2022 Christmas special episode of the British TV Series Detectorists, "Special", Lance finds a crockery cup, eyes only, in a field that turns out to be where a historic battle took place and a reliquary containing the Holy Grail was lost. A montage shows how the same crockery cup went from the hands of Jesus at the Last Supper (implied) to being lost in the field.

See also

 Akshaya Patra (Hindu mythology)
 Arma Christi
 Cornucopia (Greek mythology)
 Cup of Jamshid (Persian mythology)
Fairy cup legend
 Holy Chalice (Christian mythology)
 List of mythological objects
 Relics associated with Jesus
 Sampo (Finnish mythology)
 Salsabil (Quran)

References

Further reading
Barber, Richard (2004). The Holy Grail: Imagination and Belief. Harvard University Press.
Campbell, Joseph (1990). Transformations of Myth Through Time. Harper & Row Publishers, New York.
Loomis, Roger Sherman (1991). The Grail: From Celtic Myth to Christian Symbol. Princeton. 
Weston, Jessie L.  (1993; originally published 1920). From Ritual To Romance. Princeton University Press, Princeton, New Jersey.
Wood, Juliette (2012). The Holy Grail: History and Legend. University of Wales Press. .

External links

 
The Holy Grail at the Camelot Project
The Holy Grail at the Catholic Encyclopedia
The Holy Grail today in Valencia Cathedral
  XVth-century Old French Estoire del saint Graal manuscript BNF fr. 113 Bibliothèque Nationale de France, selection of illuminated folios, Modern French Translation, Commentaries.

 
Fictional elements introduced in the 12th century
Christian terminology
Literary motifs
Cauldrons
Magic items